Serge Noskov (born 1956 in Syktyvkar, Komi Republic, Soviet Union) is a composer. In 1986 he graduated from Gorky (now Nizhny Novgorod) State Conservatoire as a composer, as well as a music theory and history teacher.  His graduation compositions were: 1st Symphony for triple cast symphony orchestra, "Nonet" – chamber composition in three movements for 9 instruments, “Dreams” – vocal cycle for baritone and 4 instruments, set on his own poems.  After the graduation, he returned to Syktyvkar, where he wrote the 1st String Quartet, “Psalms” for a choir a'capella on texts of a poem by Victor Savin in Komi language, and the Bible, musical “Ogorod”,  numerous songs with lyrics by Komi poets of 19th century, also, a few songs for a pop-group “Aski”.  His Komi songs for children were published by a Komi Publishing House. 
In 1992 he relocated to London.  Since then he has written six Symphonies, a ballet "Zarny Kai", String Quartet No2, “Magic Mushroom” – chamber composition for an electronic synthesizer and a chamber orchestra,  art-rock album “Mayakovsky Rocks”, set on the lyrics by controversial Russian poet Vladimir Mayakovsky, “Diary of a Madman” – music for the drama by N.Gogol, soundtracks for several short films and jingles for TV adverts and theatre plays, “The Adventures of a Christmas Turkey” - a humorous composition in three movements for a symphony orchestra, "Bloody Men" - 7 songs for soprano with lyrics by Wendy Cope, and other numerous songs on lyrics by contemporary Komi, Russian and English poets.    
One of his latest works is the opera Kuratov in the Komi and Russian languages, which had its first performances on 2 and 3 October 2009 and since then has been included into the permanent repertoire of the State Opera and Ballet Theatre of Komi Republic, Russia.

In 2010 for his contribution and achievements in music Serge was awarded the Certificate of Merit by the Minister of Culture of Russian Federation.
In 2011 he was awarded the Diploma of the State Prize Laureate of Komi Republic.

Notes

 in Russian.

 in English (website about Komi culture)
  in Russian (internet portal “Business News Komi) 
 in Russian (newspaper “Respublica”)
 in Russia (newspaper “Molodyezh Severa”)
 (internet portal FU)
 in Russian (website “Syktyvkar on Line”)

References 

http://sergeinoskov.musicaneo.com/

1956 births
Living people
Russian composers
Russian male composers
People from Syktyvkar